Florijan Mićković (26 April 1935 – 19 February 2021) was a Bosnian Croat sculptor living and working in Mostar and Međugorje.

Life and work

Florijan Mićković was born in Mostar in 1935. He graduated from University of Zagreb Academy of Fine Arts in 1962, in the class of Antun Augustinčić. He has been member of the Croatian Fine Arts Association since 1963, Bosnian-Herzegovinian Fine Arts Association and is one of the founding members of the HAZU BIH. He lives and works as an independent artist in Mostar. Mićković exhibited in most European countries, Africa, the United States and Canada.

Mićković has created works of undeniable continuity and modern tradition, thus becoming a linking part of modern Bosnia and Herzegovina sculpturing. His interests and the public roles he pursued after graduation reflect a wide variety of sculpting trials, showing a considerable skillfulness in the matter and a level of creativity that could serve as a landmark in his past, present and future work environment - in Herzegovina.

In the 1990s overridden by the war, not only his work was hampered and slowed down, but he also lost his studio, together with the pieces he had been collecting for his major one-man-show. Only fragments of his artistic production can be reconstructed today by means of scarce, often damaged documentation, but Florijan Mićković’s relentless, post-war activity has
enabled him to make up for some of the losses. He has been working with a youthful drive, in his
mature age and under different conditions, not only to fill in the void in his work, but also
to open new opportunities, to experiment.

Exhibitions

One man exhibitions
 1962. Mostar, Klub Javnih Radnika
 1970. Lignano, Sabbiadoro, Italija
 1971. Dubrovnik, Galerija Doma Sinkikata
 1972. Dubrovnik, Galerija Doma Sinkikata
 1981. Mostar, Umjetnička Galerija
 1988. Ljubljana, Instiut Josef Stefan
 1989. Anacortes /USA/, Green Frog Gallery
 1989. Vancouver, Croatian Cultural Center
 1989. Calgary, Croatian Cultural Center
 1990. Vancouver, Art Gallery
 1990. Vancouver, Horisons 89
 1992. Chicago, Croatian Cultural Center
 1992. Zagreb, Galerija Miroslav Kraljević
 1998. Zagreb, Galerija Forum
 1999. Široki Brijeg, Fanjevačka Galerija
 2000. Mostar, Umjetnička Galerija
 2000. Zadar, Galerija Loža
 2000. Zagreb, Muzej Mimara
 2000. Zenica, Galerija Narodni Muzej
 2002. Sarajevo, Galerija Roman Petrovič
 2003. Mostar, Centar Za Kulturu
 2006. Rome, Il Lazio Tra Europa E Mediterraneo
 2008. Metkovic, City Galerija
 2008. Split, Galerija Bresan
 2009, Trebinje, Museum of Herzegovina
 2010, Banja Luka, Muzej savremene umjetnosti
 2011, Sarajevo, Collegium artisticum
 2011, Dubrovnik, Samostan sv. Klare
 2013, Mostar, "Galerija Aluminij"

Sculptures colonies
Florijan has taken part in many sculptures colonies; Cazin, Počitelj (BiH), Koprivnica, Slavonski Brod, Medulin (Croatia), Kragujevac (Serbia), Mostar 2004, Mostar (Radobolja) 2005.

Awards
 1989. City of Mostar award
 2000. First award on sculptures «Anale» in Sarajevo
 2002. Sculpture award / «Collegium artisticum» in Sarajevo
 2002. «Grand Prix» drawing exhibition in Mostar
 2008. «Gold Medallion» award for the ULUBIH for an outstanding contribution to the reconstruction of the international art colony in Počitelj.
 2010. ULUBIH award in recognition of an active and invaluable work with the Association of Artists of Bosnia and Herzegovina, as well as for engagement, development and promotion of cultural values in the Bosnia and Herzegovina.
 2013. City of Mostar - Order for merits in promoting the culture of the city of Mostar.
 2015. Peace Center for the multi-ethical cooperation in Mostar - recognize and award Florijan with `Mimar`award for his commitment and outstanding contributions and affirmation of peace in the difficult post-war period in Mostar.

Symposiums
 2005. European Symposium Kaisersteinbruch, setting up the stone relief of Bosnia & Herzegovina to the Wall of Unity.

Monuments and Public Sculptures
 1978. Imotski (Perića Brijeg), Jure Galić – Veliki Biste Heroja
 1961. Mostar, Dr. Safet Mujić
 1961. Mostar, Šefik Obad
 1961. Mostar, Jusuf Čevro
 1961. Mostar, Adem Buć
 1961. Mostar, Ljubo Brešan
 1961. Robert Bobby Fisher
 1961. Mostar, Rifat Frenjo
 1962. Ljubinje, Novica Domazet
 1980. Mostar, Mladen Balorda i Hasan Zahirović Laca
 1980. Mostar, Mithat Haćam
 1985. Mostar, Mustafa Ćemalović – Ćimba
 1986. Mostar, Karlo Batko
 1986. Mostar, Salko Pezo
 1986. Mostar, Zlatka Vuković
 1965. Lištica, Ljupko Matijević
 1974. Mostar, Savo Medan
 1974. Biograd (Nevesinje), Blagoje Parović
 1986. Posušje, Mostar, Dr. Ante Jamnicki
 1975. Mostar, Sarajevo, Hamza Humo (Town’s park)
 1977. Čitluk, Ivan Krndelj
 1978. Sovići, Džemal Bijedić (Elementary School)
 1979. Trsteno, Ante Miljas
 1980. Mostar, Dr. Lovro Dojmi
 1981. Mostar, Veljko Vlahović (High School)
 1978. ing. Puba Loose
 1988. Marko Zovko
 1990. Mujaga Komadina, first mayor of Mostar
 2001. Karlo Afan de Rivera, painter
 2002, Meho Sefić, painter

References

 City Museum, Virovitica, Croatia, "Exhibition of Mostar's Artist Circle", 2009, Publisher; Gallery Martino, Mostar, Bosnia and Herzegovina
 Prvi TV - Zrcalo: Florijan Mićković Documentary, 2014

External links
 mickovic.com/florijan/
 European Festivals Association
 Jewish Cultural Center with Synagogue 
 Jewish Heritage Europe 
 Medjugorje.org
 Most.ba
 The women that cried
 Museum of Hercegovina, Trebinje

1935 births
Living people
Artists from Mostar
Croats of Bosnia and Herzegovina
Bosnia and Herzegovina sculptors
Academy of Fine Arts, University of Zagreb alumni
20th-century Bosnia and Herzegovina artists
21st-century Bosnia and Herzegovina artists